The Omaha Open was a men's tennis tournament played in Omaha, Nebraska from 1970 until 1974.  The event was part of the USLTA Indoor Circuit and was held on indoor carpet courts.

Finals

Singles

Doubles

References

External links
 ATP tournament overview

Defunct tennis tournaments in the United States
Sports in Omaha, Nebraska
Carpet court tennis tournaments
Omaha Open